Margery Kempe ( – after 1438) was an English Christian mystic, known for writing through dictation The Book of Margery Kempe, a work considered by some to be the first autobiography in the English language.  Her book chronicles Kempe's domestic tribulations, her extensive pilgrimages to holy sites in Europe and the Holy Land, as well as her mystical conversations with God. She is honoured in the Anglican Communion, but has not been canonised as a Catholic saint.

Early life and family
She was born Margery Burnham or Brunham around 1373 in Bishop's Lynn (now King's Lynn), Norfolk, England. Her father, John Brunham, was a merchant in Lynn, mayor of the town and Member of Parliament. The first record of her Brunham family is a mention of her grandfather, Ralph de Brunham, in 1320 in the Red Register of Lynn.  By 1340 he had joined the Parliament of Lynn. Kempe's kinsman Robert Brunham, possibly her brother, became a Member of Parliament for Lynn in 1402 and 1417.

Life

No records remain of any formal education that Kempe may have received. As an adult, a priest read to her "works of religious devotion" in English, which suggests that she might have been unable to read them herself, although she seems to have learned various texts by heart. As one would expect, Kempe appears to have been taught the Pater Noster (the Lord's Prayer), Ave Maria, the Ten Commandments, and other "virtues, vices, and articles of faith". At around twenty years of age, Kempe married John Kempe, who became a town official in 1394. Margery and John had at least fourteen children. A letter survives from Gdańsk which identifies the name of her eldest son as John and gives a reason for his visit to Lynn in 1431.

Kempe was an orthodox Catholic and, like other medieval mystics, believed that she was summoned to a "greater intimacy with Christ" as a result of multiple visions and experiences she had as an adult. After the birth of her first child, Kempe went through a period of crisis for nearly eight months, which may perhaps have been an episode of postpartum psychosis. During her illness, Kempe claimed to have envisioned numerous devils and demons attacking her and commanding her to "forsake her faith, her family, and her friends"; she claims that they even encouraged her to commit suicide. She also had a vision of Jesus Christ in the form of a man who asked her "Daughter, why have you forsaken me, and I never forsook you?". Kempe affirms that she had visitations and conversations with Jesus, Mary, God, and other religious figures and that she had visions of being an active participant during the birth and crucifixion of Christ. These visions and hallucinations physically affected her bodily senses, causing her to hear sounds and smell unknown, strange odours. She also reports hearing a heavenly melody that made her weep and want to live a chaste life. According to Beal, "Margery found other ways to express the intensity of her devotion to God. She prayed for a chaste marriage, went to confession two or three times a day, prayed early and often each day in church, wore a hair shirt, and willingly suffered whatever negative responses her community expressed in response to her extreme forms of devotion". Kempe was also known throughout her community for her constant weeping as she begged Christ for mercy and forgiveness.

In Kempe's vision, Christ reassured her that he had forgiven her sins. "He gave her several commands: to call him her love, to stop wearing the hair shirt, to give up eating meat, to take the Eucharist every Sunday, to pray the rosary only until six o'clock, to be still and speak to him in thought…"; He also promised her that He would "give her victory over her enemies, give her the ability to answer all clerks, and that [He] will be with her and never forsake her, and to help her and never be parted from her". Kempe did not join a religious order, but carried out "her life of devotion, prayer, and tears in public". Her visions provoked her public displays of loud wailing, sobbing, and writhing which frightened and annoyed both clergy and laypeople. At one point in her life, she was imprisoned by the clergy and town officials and threatened with the possibility of rape; however, she does not record being sexually assaulted. Finally, during the 1420s she dictated her Book, known today as The Book of Margery Kempe, which illustrates her visions, mystical and religious experiences, as well as her "temptations to lechery, her travels, and her trial for heresy". Kempe's book is commonly considered to be the first autobiography written in the English language.

Kempe was tried for heresy multiple times but never convicted; she mentions with pride her ability to deny the accusations of Lollardy with which she was faced. Possible reasons for her arrests include her preaching (which was forbidden to women), her wearing of all white as a married woman (i.e. impersonating a nun), or her apparent belief that she could pray for the souls of those in purgatory and tell whether or not someone was damned, in a manner similar to the concept of the intercession of saints. Kempe was also accused of preaching without Church approval as her public speeches skirted a thin line between making statements about her personal faith and professing to teach scripture. During an inquiry into her heresy she was thought to be possessed by a devil for quoting the scripture, and reminded of Paul's prohibition against women preachers. Kempe proved to be something of a nuisance in the communities where she resided, as her frantic wailing and extreme emotional responses seemed to imply a superior connection to God that some other lay people saw as diminishing their own, or inappropriately privileged above the relationship between God and the clergy.

Spiritual autobiography

Nearly everything that is known of Kempe's life comes from her spiritual autobiography known as the Book. In the early 1430s, despite her illiteracy, Kempe decided to record her spiritual life. In the preface to the book, she describes how she employed as a scribe an Englishman who had lived in Germany, but he died before the work was completed and what he had written was unintelligible to others. This may possibly have been John Kempe, her eldest son. She then persuaded a local priest, who may have been her confessor Robert Springold, to begin rewriting on 23 July 1436, and on 28 April 1438 he started work on an additional section covering the years 1431–4.

The narrative of Kempe's Book begins with the difficult birth of her first child. After describing the demonic torment and Christic apparition that followed, Kempe undertook two domestic businesses: a brewery and a grain mill (both common home-based businesses for medieval women). Both failed after a short period of time. Although she tried to be more devout, she was tempted by sexual pleasures and social jealousy for some years.  Eventually turning away from her worldly work, Kempe dedicated herself completely to the spiritual calling that she felt her earlier vision required.  Striving to live a life of commitment to God, Kempe in the summer of 1413 negotiated a chaste marriage with her husband. Although Chapter 15 of The Book of Margery Kempe describes her decision to lead a celibate life, Chapter 21 mentions that she is pregnant once again. It has been speculated that Kempe gives birth to a child, her last, during her pilgrimage; she later relates that she brought a child with her when she returned to England. It is unclear whether the child was conceived before the Kempes began their celibacy, or in a momentary lapse after it.

Sometime around 1413, Kempe visited the female mystic and anchoress Julian of Norwich at her cell in Norwich. According to her own account, Kempe visited Julian and stayed for several days. She was especially eager to obtain Julian's approval for her visions of and conversations with God. The text reports that Julian approved of Kempe's revelations and gave Kempe reassurance that her religiosity was genuine. However, Julian did instruct and caution Kempe to "measure these experiences according to the worship they accrue to God and the profit to her fellow Christians." Julian also confirmed that Kempe's tears are physical evidence of the Holy Spirit in soul. Kempe also received affirmation of her gifts of tears by way of approving comparison to a continental holy woman. In Chapter 62, Kempe describes an encounter with a friar who was relentless in his accusation for her incessant tears.  This friar admits to having read of Marie of Oignies and now recognises that Kempe's tears are also a result of similar authentic devotion. During this time, Kempe's spiritual confessor was Richard Caister, the Vicar of St Stephen's Church, Norwich, who was buried in the church in 1420. Kempe prayed at Caister's burial place for the healing of a priest; after the priest was healed, Caister's burial place became a shrine for pilgrimage.

In 1438, the year her book is known to have been completed, a "Margueria Kempe", who may well have been Margery Kempe, was admitted to the Trinity Guild of Lynn. It is not known whether this is the same woman, however, and it is unknown when or where after this date Kempe died.

Later influence
The manuscript was copied, probably shortly before 1450, by someone who signed himself Salthows on the bottom portion of the final page. This scribe has been shown to be the Norwich monk Richard Salthouse. The manuscript contains annotations by four hands. The first page of the manuscript contains the rubric "Liber Montis Gracie. This boke is of Mountegrace," and we can be sure that some of the annotations are the work of monks associated with the important Carthusian priory of Mount Grace in Yorkshire. Although the four readers largely concerned themselves with correcting mistakes or emending the manuscript for clarity, there are also remarks about the Book's substance and some images which reflect Kempe's themes and images. A recipe, added to the final folio of the manuscript by a late-fourteenth-century or early-fifteenth-century reader of the Book, possibly at the cathedral priory in Norwich, provides more evidence of its readership and has been determined to be for medicinal sweets, or digestives, called 'dragges'.

Kempe's book was essentially lost for centuries, being known only from excerpts published by Wynkyn de Worde in around 1501, and by Henry Pepwell in 1521. However, in 1934 a manuscript (now British Library Add MS 61823, the only surviving manuscript of Kempe's Book) was found in the private library of the Butler-Bowdon family, and then consulted by Hope Emily Allen. It has since been reprinted and translated in numerous editions.

Kempe's significance
Part of Kempe's significance lies in the autobiographical nature of her book; it is the best insight available of a female, middle-class experience in the Middle Ages.  Kempe is unusual when compared to contemporaneous holy women, such as Julian of Norwich, because she, unlike Julian, was not a nun. Although Kempe has sometimes been depicted as an "oddity" or a "madwoman", recent scholarship on vernacular theologies and popular practices of piety suggests she was not as odd as she might appear.  Her Book is revealed as a carefully constructed spiritual and social commentary. Some have suggested that it was written as fiction, in order to explore the aspects of the society in which she lived in a believable way. The suggestion that Kempe wrote her book as a work of fiction is said to be supported by the fact that she speaks of herself as "this creature" throughout the text, dissociating her from her work. However, this might equally be only a way of showing her humility, as a lowly creature of God.

Her autobiography begins with "the onset of her spiritual quest, her recovery from the ghostly aftermath of her first child-bearing". There is no firm evidence that Kempe could read or write, but Leyser notes that her religious culture was certainly informed by texts. She had such works read to her, including the Incendium Amoris by Richard Rolle; Walter Hilton has been cited as another possible influence on Kempe. Among other books that Kempe had read to her were, repeatedly, the Revelations of Bridget of Sweden. Her own pilgrimages were related to those of that married saint, who had had eight children.

Kempe and her Book are significant because they express the tension in late medieval England between institutional orthodoxy and increasingly public modes of religious dissent, especially those of the Lollards. Throughout her spiritual career, Kempe was challenged by both church and civil authorities on her adherence to the teachings of the institutional Church. The Bishop of Lincoln and the Archbishop of Canterbury, Thomas Arundel, were involved in trials of her allegedly teaching and preaching on scripture and faith in public, and wearing white clothes (interpreted as hypocrisy on the part of a married woman). In his efforts to suppress heresy, Arundel had enacted laws that forbade allowing women to preach, since the very fact of a woman preaching was seen as anti-canonical.

In the 15th century, a pamphlet was published which represented Kempe as an anchoress, and which stripped from her "Book" any potential heterodoxical thought and dissenting behaviour. Because of this, some later scholars believed that she was a vowed religious holy woman like Julian of Norwich. They were surprised to encounter the psychologically and spiritually complex woman revealed in the original text of the "Book".

Mysticism
During the fourteenth century, the task of interpreting the Bible and God through the written word was nominally restricted to men, specifically ordained priests. Because of this restriction, women mystics often expressed their experience of God differently - through the senses and the body - especially in the late Middle Ages. Mystics directly experienced God in three classical ways: first, bodily visions, meaning to be aware with one's senses - sight, sound, or others; second, ghostly visions, such as spiritual visions and sayings directly imparted to the soul; and lastly, intellectual enlightenment, where one's mind came into a new understanding of God.

Pilgrimages

Kempe was motivated to make a pilgrimage by hearing or reading the English translation of Bridget of Sweden's Revelations. This work promotes the purchase of indulgences at holy sites; these were pieces of paper representing the pardoning by the Church of purgatorial time otherwise owed after death due to sins. Kempe went on many pilgrimages and is known to have purchased indulgences for friends, enemies, the souls trapped in Purgatory and herself.

First Great Pilgrimage, 1413-1415 
In 1413, soon after her father's death, Kempe left her husband to make a pilgrimage to the Holy Land. During the winter, she spent thirteen weeks in Venice but she talks little about her observations of Venice in her book. At the time Venice was at "the height of its medieval splendor, rich in commerce and holy relics." From Venice, Kempe travelled to Jerusalem via Ramlah.
 
Kempe's voyage from Venice to Jerusalem is not a large part of her story overall. It is thought that she passed through Jaffa, which was the usual port for pilgrims who were heading to Jerusalem. One vivid detail that she recalls was her riding on a donkey when she saw Jerusalem for the first time, probably from Nabi Samwil, and that she nearly fell off the donkey because she was in such shock from the vision in front of her. During her pilgrimage Kempe visited places that she saw to be holy. She was in Jerusalem for three weeks and went to Bethlehem where Christ was born. She visited Mount Zion, which was where she believed Jesus had washed his disciples' feet. Kempe visited the burial places of Jesus, his mother Mary and the cross itself. Finally, she went to the River Jordan and Mount Quarentyne, which was where they believed Jesus had fasted for forty days, and Bethany, where Martha, Mary and Lazarus had lived.
   
After she visited the Holy Land, Kempe returned to Italy and stayed in Assisi before going to Rome. Like many other medieval English pilgrims, Kempe resided at the Hospital of Saint Thomas of Canterbury in Rome. During her stay, she visited many churches including San Giovanni in Laterano, Santa Maria Maggiore, Santi Apostoli, San Marcello and St Birgitta's Chapel. She did not leave Rome until Easter 1415. When Kempe returned to Norwich, she passed through Middelburg (in today's Netherlands).

Pilgrimage to Santiago de Compostela, 1417-1418 
In 1417, Kempe set off again on pilgrimage to Santiago de Compostela in Spain, travelling via Bristol, where she stayed at Henbury with Thomas Peverel, bishop of Worcester. On her return from Spain she visited the shrine of the holy blood at Hailes Abbey, in Gloucestershire, and then went on to Leicester. Kempe recounts several public interrogations during her travels. One followed her arrest by the Mayor of Leicester who accused her, in Latin, of being a "cheap whore, a lying Lollard," and threatened her with prison. After Kempe was able to insist on the right of accusations to be made in English and to defend herself she was briefly cleared, but then brought to trial again by the Abbot, Dean and Mayor, and imprisoned for three weeks. After this, Kempe continued on to York. Here, she had many friends with whom she wept and attended mass. She also encountered further accusation, specifically of heresy, of which she was eventually found innocent by the Archbishop. She returned to Lynn some time in 1418.

She visited important sites and religious figures in England, including Philip Repyngdon (the Bishop of Lincoln), Henry Chichele, and Thomas Arundel (both Archbishops of Canterbury). During the 1420s Kempe lived apart from her husband. When he fell ill, however, she returned to Lynn to be his nursemaid. Their son, who lived in Germany, also returned to Lynn with his wife. However, both her son and husband died in 1431.

Pilgrimage to Prussia, 1433-1434 
The last section of Kempe's book deals with a journey, beginning in April 1433, aiming to travel to Danzig with her daughter-in-law. From Danzig, Kempe visited the Holy Blood of Wilsnack relic. She then travelled to Aachen, and returned to Lynn via Calais, Canterbury and London (where she visited Syon Abbey).

Veneration
Margery Kempe is honoured in the Church of England with a commemoration on 9 November and in the Episcopal Church in the United States of America together with Richard Rolle and Walter Hilton on 9 November.

Memorial
In 2018 the Mayor of King's Lynn, Nick Daubney, unveiled a bench commemorating Kempe in the Saturday Market Place. The bench was designed by local furniture-maker, Toby Winteringham, and sponsored by the King's Lynn Civic Society.

There is a Margery Kempe Society, founded in 2018 by Laura Kalas of Swansea University and Laura Varnam of University College, Oxford, whose aim is the support and promotion of the scholarship, study and teaching of The Book of Margery Kempe.

In 2020, a statue in honour of Kempe was erected at the entrance of a medieval bridge in Oroso in Northern Spain, on the pilgrimage trail she would have followed to Santiago de Compostela.

Dramatic depictions
Kempe's life and her Book have been the subject of several dramatic portrayals:
 The Saintliness of Margery Kempe, written by John Wulp in 1959, and revived in 2018.
 Margery Kempe, written by Robert Glück in 1994 and republished by the New York Review of Books in 2020.
 Margery Kempe: The Wife of Lynn's Tale, written by Gareth Calway in 2015.
 Skirting Heresy: The Life and Times of Margery Kempe, written by academic Elizabeth MacDonald in 2018.

Modern editions 
 
  Prefatory note by Hope Emily Allen.
  With an introduction by R.W. Chambers.
 
 
  Republished online as

A fictionalised treatment

References

Further reading

 Castagna, Valentina Re-reading Margery Kempe in the 21st Century, New York: Peter Lang, 2011.
 Cholmeley, Katharine Margery Kempe, Genius and Mystic, New York: Longmans, Green and Co., 1947.

 McEntire, Sandra Margery Kempe: A Book of Essays, New York: Garland, 1992.
 Mitchell, Marea The Book of Margery Kempe: Scholarship, Community, and Criticism, New York: Peter Lang, 2005.

External links

British Library MS Add. 61823: The Margery Kempe Manuscript
Middle English Text of The Book of Margery Kempe
Mapping Margery Kempe, a site including the full text of her book with explanations
Maps of Margery Kempe's pilgrimages, "Aspects of the High Middle Ages," University of Edinburgh School of Divinity
The Book of Margery Kempe at Google Books
The Soul a City: Margery and Julian
In Our Time podcast: Margery Kempe and English Mysticism

1373 births
14th-century English businesspeople
14th-century English women
14th-century Christian mystics
15th-century deaths
15th-century English women writers
15th-century English writers
15th-century Christian mystics
Roman Catholic mystics
English Catholic mystics
Middle English literature
Medieval historical texts
English Roman Catholics
English autobiographers
English religious writers
Women religious writers
People from King's Lynn
Pre-Reformation Anglican saints
Female saints of medieval England
English women non-fiction writers
Women autobiographers
Women mystics
Anglican saints
Medieval businesswomen
15th-century English businesspeople